The Wass family (also known as czegei Wass or cegei Wass) is one of the oldest Hungarian noble families in Transylvania (today part of Romania); their lineage can be traced without interruption from the beginning of the 14th century.

Origins
The origins of the family Wass de Cege/Czege (Hungarian name; Romanian: Țaga) are unknown, however it is very likely that they came to Transylvania from Western Hungary. According to a diploma of doubtful authenticity the first two ancestors known by name under king Béla III of Hungary (1172–1176) took part in the king's campaign led against the Byzantine Empire. As a reward for that the two of them were donated nine villages in the County Doboka (Romanian: Dăbâca).

The exact lineage of the family can be traced continuously only beginning with the 14th century. By that time Miklós Wass Sr castellan of Csicsó (Ciceu), was familiaris of the Transylvanian voivode Ladislaus Kán who rose up against king Charles I of Hungary (1310–1342), but afterwards, the family members succeeding him excelled in their loyalty to the king.

For several decades in the 14th century Transylvania was ruled by voievodes from the Lackfi family (House of Lacković), who also held many other important offices in the government. Being their familiares, the Wass came into offices as castellan at Höltövény, Csicsó (Ciceu), Küküllővár (Cetatea de Baltă), Kőhalom (Rupea), Cserög (Čerević) castles, comes (Doboka, Kolozs) or vicecomes (Ugocsa). They took part in Louis the Great’s (1342–1382) campaigns against Croatia, Bosnia, Bulgaria, Italy and Walachia. For their services the king donated them smaller estates, in 1363 they acquired ius gladii (which meant absolute power in trialing their serfs) and the right to hold weekly fairs in Cege.

From the end of the 14th century they ceased getting other offices or other estates, and relapsed into the world of the well-off country nobility. Only after the fall of the Medieval Hungary (1541) did they get political roles within the Transylvanian Principality.

In the Middle Ages the Wass had their main estates in Cege (Ţaga), Szentegyed (Sântejude), Szentgothárd (Sucutard), Mohaly (Măhal), Szentiván (Sântioana), Pulyon (Puini) and Boncnyíres (Bonţ), which were neighbouring villages in county Doboka and remained the property of the family. Beginning with the first decades of the 14th century they had smaller estates in Western Hungary, as well in counties Vas, Veszprém and Győr, however these were lost to other families.

György Wass, was the first member of the family playing a political role in the life of the forming Transylvanian Principate. He was given several estates in the Mezőség, such as Záh (Torda county) or Velkér (Kolozs county). Under the princes rising from the Báthori (Báthory) family, György Wass became in the last quarter of the 16th century comes of Kolozs county, captain of Szamosújvár, and councillor of the prince. He did not agree with prince Sigismund Báthory (1588–1602), who breaking with the Ottoman-friendly policy preferred the Habsburgs, therefore he was imprisoned, where – in order to avoid execution – in 1594 he committed suicide. In spite of that, his sons went on taking part in the political life of Transylvania.

One of them, János (†1635) having been brought up by the Jesuits, became a convinced Catholic in such times when the Catholic Church was barely tolerated in the Principate. Except for him all the Wass descendants were Calvinists until the mid 19th century, and many of them studied in the famous colleges of Nagyenyed and Kolozsvár. György Wass (1658 or 1659–1705) played role in the political events of the late 17th and early 18th centuries when the so far independent Transylvanian Principate was put under Habsburg control. During that process he went to Vienna for several times in order to negotiate with the Habsburg government. Not much later he joined the uprising against the Habsburgs led by Ferenc Rákóczi (1704–1711). Both himself and his son László (1696–1738) kept a diary, which are now important sources referring to the Transylvanian political and social history of that time.

Dániel Wass (1674–1741), just like his above mentioned relative, left the Habsburgs’ side in order to join Rákóczi. Dániel's sons, Miklós, György and Ádám were donated a title by empress Maria Theresa of Austria, queen of Hungary (1740–1780). Throughout the 18th century the family possessed estates in Northern Hungary as well, and lived partly there, partly in Transylvania. However, in the first part of the 19th century the Wass got settled definitively on the Transylvanian estates. One of the representative members of the family in that century was Samu Wass (1814–1879), who after fighting in the Hungarian Revolution of 1848 went into exile.

He spent considerable time in California, where together with another Hungarian exile he opened a gold-mine, obtained the authorization of the government and had dollars minted. Only in 1858 was he allowed to turn back home. Some of the Wass were members of the Hungarian Parliament in the 19th century, or held positions in government offices. Three branches of the family lived to enter the 20th century. Two branches had been living at Cege, and both of them died out on male line before World War II. Each of the two had a castle there, although only the smaller one survived. The third family had its residence at Szentgothárd. The writer Albert Wass (1908–1998) belonged to this branch. In 1945 he flew to Germany then settled down in the United States, nevertheless he was sentenced to death by the Romanian People's Tribunals (an exceptional court called Peoples Court) in his absence in 1946. The castle of Szentgothárd had been destroyed after the war.

Somewhat before 1920 Béla Wass (1853–1936) deposited the family archives in the collection of the Erdélyi Múzeum-Egyesület (Transylvanian Museum Society). Ottilia Wass (1829–1917) gave his house in Kolozsvár to the Society; both donations have been confiscated by the state. After World War II the family was forced to emigrate, first having been deprived of all their possessions. Since then the male line has been living in the United States and in Germany, the other one, the female line lives in Austria.

Notable members of the family
Albert Wass (1908-1998) - Hungarian noble, forest engineer, novelist, poet 
Huba Wass de Czege (born 1941) - American Brigadier general

See also
List of titled noble families in the Kingdom of Hungary

Hungarian nobility in Transylvania